The Rural Municipality of Loreburn No. 254 is a rural municipality (RM) in the Canadian province of Saskatchewan within Census Division No. 11 and  Division No. 5. It is located in the south-central portion of the province.

History 
The RM of Loreburn No. 254 incorporated as a rural municipality on December 12, 1910.

Geography

Communities and localities 
The following urban municipalities are surrounded by the RM.

Villages
 Elbow
 Hawarden
 Loreburn
 Strongfield

The following unincorporated communities are within the RM.

Localities
Cutbank

Demographics 

Government 
The RM of Loreburn No. 254 is governed by an elected municipal council and an appointed administrator that meets on the second Wednesday of every month. The reeve of the RM is Kevin Vollmer while its administrator is Vanessa Tastad. The RM's office is located in Loreburn.

See also 
 List of rural municipalities in Saskatchewan

References 

Loreburn

Division No. 11, Saskatchewan